István Ludánszki (born 27 July 1987, in Debrecen) is a Hungarian association football defender. He currently plays for Balmazújvárosi FC.

References
HLSZ 
Futball-adattar 

1987 births
Living people
Sportspeople from Debrecen
Association football defenders
Hungarian footballers
Debreceni VSC players
Létavértes SC players
Zalaegerszegi TE players
Integrál-DAC footballers
BFC Siófok players
Balmazújvárosi FC players
FC Tatabánya players
Nemzeti Bajnokság I players